Southcote may refer to:

Places in England
 Southcote, Bedfordshire, hamlet of Linslade
 Southcote, Berkshire, suburb of Reading
 Southcote Junction
 Southcote Lock
 Southcote or Southcoterow: a disused mediaeval name for an area of farmland and houses near Heathrow

Family
 Southcote family, a prominent family from Devon and Cornwall in England.
 Southcote baronets, an extinct title in the Baronetage of England

People
 George Southcote (disambiguation)
 Joanna Southcott (or Southcote, 1750-1814), self-described prophetess from Devon
 Philip Southcote (1698–1758), English landscape-gardener
 Thomas Southcote (died 1600), English politician
 Thomas Southcote (1622–1664), English landowner and politician
 John Southcote (died 1585) (1510/11–1585), English judge and politician

Other
 Southcote (band), a Canadian band

See also
 Southcott (disambiguation)